Villalbos  is a small village in the north-east of Burgos Province, autonomous community of Castilla-Leon (Spain).

Geography
Villalbos is located in the left border of Oca River that leads to Ebro river.

Wikimapia\Coordenadas: 42°26'40"N   3°19'47"W

History
At the beginning of the 10th century a Castilian count, don Rodrigo Díaz, known as "Abolmondar Albo" in the mozarabic world, founded a settlement next to the Oca river. From those settlements came the actual towns of Villalmondar (Abolmondar) and Villalbos (Albos).

Photo gallery

Church
The Catholic Church of Saint Thomas Apostle was built in the past but it still keeps the Bell's Tower, the main Latin cross plant and the cemetery.

Demography

External links
 https://web.archive.org/web/20100429073256/http://www.everyoneweb.com/villalbos/ Villalbos "Abolmondar Albo's Land" (in Spanish)
 http://webs.ono.com/villalbos/ (Unofficial Web in Spanish Language)

Towns in Spain